Ayesha Melody Green (born 1987) is a painter and artist from New Zealand. Her works are inspired by her Māori heritage and often use the kokowai pigment.

Early life and education
Green was born in 1987 in Christchurch, New Zealand. She is of Kāi Tahu and Ngāti Kahungunu tribal descent. She originally intended to be a filmmaker and completed a bachelor's degree in media arts at Wintec. After developing an interest in painting, she completed a masters of fine arts at the Elam School of Fine Arts in 2013 followed by a graduate diploma in museums and cultural heritage.

Career
In 2019 she won the National Contemporary Arts Award for her painting Nana's Birthday.  These awards are run by the Waikato Museum Te Whare Taonga o Waikato. The judge was Fiona Pardington and there were 52 finalists from 300 entries.

Green was awarded an Arts Foundation Springboard award in 2020. As part of this award she was mentored by Suzanne Ellison the Runaka Manager for Kati Huirapa Runaka ki Puketeraki.

In 2020 her sculpture, Ko te Tuhono, was selected by the Dunedin City Council to feature as public art in the Octagon, the city centre. It was installed in December 2021, and mayor Aaron Hawkins said its installation marked "a cultural maturing of our city".

In November 2021, her diptych painting All of my Lovers are Immigrants (Smooth my Pillow) sold for 48,000 at auction; she had sold it the year before for $19,000.

Exhibitions 
 2019: Elizabeth The First, Jhana Millers Gallery
 2020: He Tohu, Group Exhibition, Jhana Millers Gallery
 2020: Wrapped Up in Clouds, Dunedin Public Art Gallery
 2021: The Right Place?, Jhana Millers Gallery
 2021: Good Citizen, Jhana Millers Gallery
 2022: Folk Nationalism, Tauranga Art Gallery
 2022: Screaming Waterfall, Jhana Millers Gallery
 2022/23: Still Life, Te Uru Waitakere Contemporary Gallery

References

External links
 Toi Tū Toi Ora Artist Profile: Ayesha Green
 Ayesha Green on Instagram

1987 births
Living people
New Zealand women artists
New Zealand Māori artists
Artists from Christchurch
Elam Art School alumni
Ngāi Tahu people
Ngāti Kahungunu people